The Taoiseach is the  head of government, or prime minister, of Ireland. The office is appointed by the president of Ireland upon the nomination of Dáil Éireann (the lower house of the Oireachtas, Ireland's national legislature) and the office-holder must retain the support of a majority in the Dáil to remain in office.

The Irish word taoiseach means "chief" or "leader", and was adopted in the 1937 Constitution of Ireland as the title of the "head of the Government or Prime Minister". It is the official title of the head of government in both English and Irish, and is not used for the prime ministers of other countries, who are instead referred to in Irish by the generic term príomh-aire. The phrase an Taoiseach is sometimes used in an otherwise English-language context, and means the same as "the Taoiseach".

The current Taoiseach is Leo Varadkar TD, leader of Fine Gael, who again took office on 17 December 2022 following a planned rotation as part of the coalition agreement between Fianna Fáil, Fine Gael, and the Green Party. Micheál Martin TD held the post from June 2020 until December 2022 as part of that agreement.

Overview
Under the Constitution of Ireland, the Taoiseach is nominated by a simple majority of the voting members of Dáil Éireann. They are then formally appointed to office by the President, who is required to appoint whomever the Dáil designates, without the option of declining to make the appointment. For this reason, the Taoiseach may, informally, be said to have been "elected" by Dáil Éireann.

If the Taoiseach loses the support of a majority in Dáil Éireann, they are not automatically removed from office. Instead, they are compelled either to resign or to persuade the President to dissolve the Dáil. If the President refuses to grant a dissolution, this effectively forces the Taoiseach to resign. To date, no president has exercised this prerogative, although the option arose in 1944 and 1994, and twice in 1982. The Taoiseach may lose the support of Dáil Éireann by the passage of a vote of no confidence, or implicitly, through the failure of a vote of confidence. Alternatively, the Dáil may refuse supply. In the event of the Taoiseach's resignation, they continue to exercise the duties and functions of office until the appointment of a successor.

The Taoiseach nominates the remaining members of the Government, who are then, with the consent of the Dáil, appointed by the President. The Taoiseach is authorised to advise the President to dismiss cabinet ministers from office; by convention the President follows this advice. The Taoiseach is further responsible for appointing eleven members of the Seanad.

The Department of the Taoiseach is the government department which supports and advises the Taoiseach in carrying out their various duties. The Taoiseach is assisted by one or more Ministers of State at the Department of the Taoiseach, one of whom is the Government Chief Whip.

Salary
Since 2013, the Taoiseach's annual salary is €185,350. It was cut from €214,187 to €200,000 when Enda Kenny took office, before being cut further to €185,350 under the Haddington Road Agreement in 2013.

A proposed increase of €38,000 in 2007 was deferred when Brian Cowen became Taoiseach and in October 2008, the government announced a 10% salary cut for all ministers, including the Taoiseach. However this was a voluntary cut and the salaries remained nominally the same with both ministers and Taoiseach essentially refusing 10% of their salary. This caused controversy in December 2009 when a salary cut of 20% was based on the higher figure before the refused amount was deducted. The Taoiseach is also allowed an additional €118,981 in annual expenses.

Residence
There is no official residence of the Taoiseach. In 2008 it was reported speculatively that the former Steward's Lodge at Farmleigh adjoining the Phoenix Park would become the official residence of the Taoiseach; however no official statements were made nor any action taken. The house, which forms part of the Farmleigh estate acquired by the State in 1999 for €29.2m, was renovated at a cost of nearly €600,000 in 2005 by the Office of Public Works. Former Taoiseach Bertie Ahern did not use it as a residence, but his successor Brian Cowen used it occasionally.

Salute
"" ("More of Cloyne") is a traditional air collected by Patrick Weston Joyce in 1873. "Amhrán Dóchais" ("Song of Hope") is a poem written by Osborn Bergin in 1913. John A. Costello chose the air as his musical salute. The salute is played by army bands on the arrival of the Taoiseach at state ceremonies. Though the salute is often called "", Brian Ó Cuív argued "" is the correct title.

History

Origins and etymology
Though the Taoiseach is described in the Constitution of Ireland as "the head of the Government or Prime Minister", its literal translation is chieftain or leader. , in turn, refers to the system of tanistry, the Gaelic system of succession whereby a leader would appoint an heir apparent while still living.

In Scottish Gaelic,  translates as clan chief and both words originally had similar meanings in the Gaelic languages of Scotland and Ireland. The related Welsh language word  (current meaning: 'prince') has a similar origin and meaning. It is hypothesised that both derive ultimately from the proto-Celtic  'chieftain, leader'.

Although the Irish form  is sometimes used in English instead of 'the Taoiseach', the English version of the Constitution states that he or she "shall be called … the Taoiseach".

Debate on the title
In 1937 when the draft Constitution of Ireland was being debated in the Dáil, Frank MacDermot, an opposition politician, moved an amendment to substitute "Prime Minister" for the proposed "Taoiseach" title in the English text of the Constitution. It was proposed to keep the "Taoiseach" title in the Irish language text. The proponent remarked:

The President of the Executive Council, Éamon de Valera, gave the term's meaning as "chieftain" or "Captain". He said he was "not disposed" to support the proposed amendment and felt the word "Taoiseach" did not need to be changed. The proposed amendment was defeated on a vote and "Taoiseach" was included as the title ultimately adopted by plebiscite of the people.

Modern office

The modern position of Taoiseach was established by the 1937 Constitution of Ireland and is the most powerful role in Irish politics. The office replaced the position of President of the Executive Council of the 1922–1937 Irish Free State.

The positions of Taoiseach and President of the Executive Council differed in certain fundamental respects. Under the Constitution of the Irish Free State, the latter was vested with considerably less power and was largely just the chairman of the cabinet, the Executive Council. For example, the President of the Executive Council could not dismiss a fellow minister on his own authority. Instead, the Executive Council had to be disbanded and reformed entirely to remove a member. The President of the Executive Council also did not have the right to advise the Governor-General to dissolve Dáil Éireann on his own authority, that power belonging collectively to the Executive Council.

In contrast, the Taoiseach created in 1937 possesses a much more powerful role. The holder of the position can both advise the President to dismiss ministers and dissolve Parliament on his own authority—advice that the President is almost always required to follow by convention. His role is greatly enhanced because under the Constitution, he is both  and  chief executive. In most other parliamentary democracies, the head of state is at least the nominal chief executive, while being bound by convention to act on the advice of the cabinet. In Ireland, however, executive power is explicitly vested in the Government, of which the Taoiseach is the leader.

Since the Taoiseach is the head of government, and may remove ministers at will, many of the powers specified, in law or the constitution, to be exercised by the government as a collective body, are in reality at the will of the Taoiseach. The Government almost always backs the Taoiseach in major decisions, and in many cases often merely formalises that decision at a subsequent meeting after it has already been announced. Nevertheless, the need for collective decision making on paper acts as a safeguard against an unwise decision made by the Taoiseach.

Generally, where there have been multi-party or coalition governments, the Taoiseach has been the leader of the largest party in the coalition. One exception to this was John A. Costello, who was not leader of his party, but an agreed choice to head the government, because the other parties refused to accept then Fine Gael leader Richard Mulcahy as Taoiseach. In 2011 Taoiseach Brian Cowen, resigned as party leader and was succeeded by Micheál Martin, but continued as Taoiseach until the formation of a new government following a general election.

List of office holders

Before the enactment of the 1937 Constitution, the head of government was the President of the Executive Council. This office was first held by W. T. Cosgrave of Cumann na nGaedheal from 1922 to 1932, and then by Éamon de Valera of Fianna Fáil from 1932 to 1937. By convention, Taoisigh are numbered to include Cosgrave; therefore, Micheál Martin is considered the 15th Taoiseach, not the 14th.

Timeline

Further reading

.

Biographies
Biographies are also available of de Valera, Lemass, Lynch, Cosgrave, FitzGerald, Haughey, Reynolds and Ahern. FitzGerald wrote an autobiography, while an authorised biography was produced of de Valera.

Some biographies and memoirs of former Taoisigh and presidents of the Executive Council:
Tim Pat Coogan, Éamon de Valera
John Horgan, Seán Lemass
Brian Farrell, Seán Lemass
T. P. O'Mahony, Jack Lynch: A Biography
T. Ryle Dwyer, Nice Fellow: A Biography of Jack Lynch
Stephen Collins, The Cosgrave Legacy
Garret FitzGerald, All in a Life
Garret FitzGerald, Just Garret: Tales from the Political Frontline
Raymond Smith, Garret: The Enigma
T. Ryle Dwyer, Short Fellow: A Biography of Charles Haughey
Martin Mansergh, Spirit of the Nation: The Collected Speeches of Haughey
Joe Joyce & Peter Murtagh The Boss: Charles Haughey in Government
Tim Ryan, Albert Reynolds: The Longford Leader
Albert Reynolds, My Autobiography
Bertie Ahern, My Autobiography

See also
Politics of the Republic of Ireland
Records of Irish heads of government since 1922
Irish heads of government since 1919

Notes

References

External links

 
Government ministers of the Republic of Ireland
Heads of government
Lists of political office-holders in the Republic of Ireland
Titles of national or ethnic leadership
Westminster system
Ireland
1937 establishments in Ireland